War and Peace is a 2007 French-Italian miniseries directed by Robert Dornhelm. It was broadcast in Italy (Rai 1), Belgium (RTBF), in France (France 2) and in Russia (Telekanal Rossiya) in four parts during October and November 2007. It was inspired by Leo Tolstoy's 1869 novel War and Peace, which also is divided into four parts. The actors are of different nationalities.

Cast
 Alexander Beyer as Pierre Bezukhov
 Clémence Poésy as Natasha Rostova
 Alessio Boni as Andrei Bolkonsky
 Malcolm McDowell as Prince Bolkonsky, The father
 Andrea Giordana as Count Rostov
 Brenda Blethyn as Márja Dmitriyevna Achrosímova
 Violante Placido as Helene Kuragina
 Toni Bertorelli as Vasily Kuragin
 Hannelore Elsner as Countess Rostova
 Benjamin Sadler as Dolokhov
 Pilar Abella as Mademoiselle Bourienne
 Ken Duken as Anatole Kuragin
 Hary Prinz as Denisov
 Vladimir Ilyin as Kutuzov
 Dimitri Isayev as Nikolai Rostov
 Valentina Cervi as Maria Bolkonskaya
 Elodie Frenck as Lise
 Scali Delpeyrat as Napoléon
 Frédéric Gorny as Ramballe
 Igor Kostolevsky as Tsar Alexander
 Ana Caterina Morariu as Sonja
 Romualdas Ramanauskas as General Mack

External links

2007 television films
2007 films
Films based on War and Peace
French epic films
Italian epic films
Television shows set in Russia
Television series set in the 1810s
Films scored by Jan A. P. Kaczmarek
Napoleonic Wars films
Films directed by Robert Dornhelm
2000s French films